Frederick William Herbert Nicholas (25 July 1893 – 20 October 1962) was an English first-class cricketer who played for Essex County Cricket Club in a first-class career that spanned from 1912 to 1929. He also played association football as a forward for Great Britain at the 1920 Olympics and for the Corinthian club, for whom he scored 28 goals in 54 appearances.

The cricketer and broadcaster Mark Nicholas is his grandson.

References

External links

1893 births
1962 deaths
English cricketers
Essex cricketers
Bedfordshire cricketers
Alumni of Hertford College, Oxford
People educated at Forest School, Walthamstow
English footballers
Footballers at the 1920 Summer Olympics
Gentlemen of the South cricketers
Harlequins cricketers
Association football forwards
Corinthian F.C. players
Sportspeople from Kuala Lumpur
Sir Julien Cahn's XI cricketers
English cricketers of 1919 to 1945
S. B. Joel's XI cricketers
Olympic footballers of Great Britain